Kangal power station is a 457 MW coal-fired power station in Turkey in Sivas, mostly built in the late 20th century, which burns lignite mined locally. The plant is owned by Anadolu Birlik Holding via Konya Şeker and in 2018 received 51 million lira capacity payments. The area is a sulfur dioxide air pollution hotspot, and agricultural soil is contaminated with chromium, nickel and mercury.

References

External links 

 Kangal power station on Global Energy Monitor

Coal-fired power stations in Turkey